Earl of Irvine was a title in the Peerage of Scotland. It was created in 1642 for James Campbell, Lord Kintyre. He was the son of Archibald Campbell, 7th Earl of Argyll, by his second wife Anne Cornwallis.Campbell had already been created Lord Kintyre in 1627 and was made Lord Lundie at the same time as he was granted the earldom. These titles were also in the Peerage of Scotland.

He served as colonel of the Garde Écossaise in France, on his death in 1645 and was succeeded by Sir Robert Moray.

He died childless in 1645 when the creations of 1642 became extinct. The lordship of Kintyre devolved upon his elder half-brother Archibald Campbell, 1st Marquess of Argyll.

Earls of Irvine (1642)
James Campbell, 1st Earl of Irvine (1610–1645)

See also
Duke of Argyll
Clan Campbell

References

Extinct earldoms in the Peerage of Scotland
Earl of
Noble titles created in 1642
1642 establishments in Scotland
1645 disestablishments in Scotland
History of North Ayrshire
Younger sons of earls